Casco Bay Lines (also known as the Casco Bay Island Transit District, CBITD) is a publicly run transportation company that services the residents of the islands of Casco Bay.  These islands include Peaks Island, Little Diamond Island, Great Diamond Island, Diamond Cove, Long Island, Chebeague Island, and Cliff Island.

The company has a fleet of five vessels. Schedules to the islands vary seasonally.  During the summer months, many more ferry trips go back and forth to the islands, while there are significantly fewer trips during the winter.

History

The Casco Bay Steamboat Company began providing permanent year-round service to Casco Bay Islands in 1878.  In 1881 the Harpswell Line began providing regular service to the outer bay islands.  The lines merged in 1907 as the Casco Bay and Harpswell Steamboat Company.  The company shut down in July 1919 as a direct result of World War I.  A smaller company named Casco Bay Lines was formed that winter.

CBITD is a non-profit organization that was established through emergency State legislation in 1981.  CBITD acquired CBL assets through bankruptcy proceedings to ensure the continuation of transportation service between their primary terminal hub in Portland, Maine and the islands of Casco Bay.  CBITD is governed by a board of 12 directors, 10 of whom are elected from the island communities.  One is appointed by the City of Portland; another is appointed by the Commissioner of the Maine Department of Transportation.

Many workers from the island communities depend on CBITD to get them to work every day and to take them home.  All school children who live on the islands have to use CBITD service to get back and forth to school (this applies to 6th grade and up.)  There is a car ferry that services Peaks Island and a freight ferry that services all of the "down bay" islands, including Long Island, Chebeague Island, and Cliff Island.

The signature color patterns of the Casco Bay Lines fleet is (from bottom up): black, yellow, white, and red. Casco Bay Lines was once located at Custom House Wharf but was moved in the 1980s to its current location on the Maine State Pier. When the company was first established it used steamboats to transport its cargo.  Some of the more famous steamboats included the Aucocisco, Maquoit, and Machigonne. Its first ferry was the Abenaki, which operated on Casco Bay for nearly five decades.

The Portland Ferry terminal received a substantial renovation and addition in 2014 designed by Scott Simons Architects.

Fleet

Aucocisco III
Maquoit II (the Casco Bay mailboat)
Machigonne II
Bay Mist
Wabanaki (Christened February 2014 and entered service shortly thereafter)

Retired vessels 
Cadet Merrycneag Longfellow
Machigonne
Maquoit
Quickwater
Abenaki (now a charter boat on the Hudson River in New York City named Half Moon)
Aucocisco
Aucocisco II  (last operated as the Silver Star in Essex, CT. Scrapped in 2007)
Emita II (sold first as a canal boat on the Erie Canal and again sold in 2018 to Harbor Country Adventures in New Buffalo, MI)
Sunshine
Gurnet
Berkley
Island Adventure (now tour boat Cosmo operating in New York City)
Island Romance (sold in late 2014 to El Dorado Cruise LLC, Staten Island, NY)
Rebel
Island Holiday (sold on 11/15/06 to Chattanooga Water Taxi, LLC; renamed Fat Cat)
Narmarda
Admiral
Tourist
Sabino (now a tour boat at Mystic Seaport in Mystic, CT)
Emita
Joan
Edward B.
Sebascodegan
Pilgrim
Nellie G. III

Terminal
The Casco Bay Lines Ferry Terminal is located in Portland, Maine on the Maine State Pier. It was originally constructed in the 1980s. In the summer of 2014, a major renovation and addition designed by Scott Simons Architects opened to the public---effectively doubling the size of the original building. The new terminal received an Honorable Mention at the American Institute of Architects (AIA) New England Design 2014 Design Awards and an AIA Maine Honor Award in 2016.

References

External links

Casco Bay Lines Official Site
Long Island Tourism Site
Peaks Island Tourism Site
Cliff Island Tourism Site
Secondary Peaks Island Tourism Site
Diamond Cove Site

Ferry companies of Maine
Peaks Island, Maine
Companies based in Portland, Maine
Casco Bay